The 2018 Big West Conference men's basketball tournament was the postseason men's basketball tournament for the Big West Conference of the 2017–18 NCAA Division I men's basketball season. It was held from March 8–10, 2018 at the Honda Center in Anaheim, California. No. 4 seed Cal State Fullerton defeated No. 3 seed UC Irvine in the championship game to win the tournament winner and receive the conference's automatic bid to the NCAA tournament.

Seeds
The top eight conference teams were eligible for the tournament. Teams were seeded by record within the conference, with a tiebreaker system to seed teams with identical conference records. Teams were reseed after the quarterfinals.

Schedule and results

Bracket

References

Big West Conference men's basketball tournament
Tournament
Big West Conference men's basketball tournament
Big West Conference men's basketball tournament